Exguiana is a genus of snout moths in the subfamily Phycitinae. It was described by Herbert H. Neunzig and Maria Alma Solis in 2004 and is known from South America.

Species
 Exguiana beckeri Neunzig & Solis, 2004 
 Exguiana limonensis Neunzig & Solis, 2004 
 Exguiana pitillana Neunzig & Solis, 2004 
 Exguiana postflavida (Dyar, 1923)

References

Phycitini
Pyralidae genera